Gladys de Seminario (born 4 March 1966) is a Peruvian sports shooter. She competed in the women's 50 metre rifle three positions event at the 1984 Summer Olympics.

References

1966 births
Living people
Peruvian female sport shooters
Olympic shooters of Peru
Shooters at the 1984 Summer Olympics
Place of birth missing (living people)